Vladimir Kirsanov (13 August 1947 – 20 March 2021) was a Russian choreographer and dancer.

Biography
He was awarded the title of Merited Artist of the Russian Federation. He studied at the State School of Circus and Variety Arts. Kirsanov died on 20 March 2021 in Moscow, after suffering from COVID-19.

References

1947 births
2021 deaths
Russian choreographers
Russian male dancers
Honored Artists of the Russian Federation
Deaths from the COVID-19 pandemic in Russia